The Filmfare Best Villain Award was given by Filmfare as part of its annual Filmfare Awards for Hindi films, to recognise an actor who had delivered an outstanding performance in a negative role. Although the awards started in 1954, this category was first introduced in 1992 and has not been awarded since 2007.

Superlatives
As the award was instituted in 1991, it could not be given to some of the famous Bollywood villains of the preceding decades:
 Amjad Khan for his role of Gabbar Singh in Sholay (1975), although he was nominated in the Best Supporting Actor category.
 Amrish Puri for his role of Mogambo in Mr. India (1987), although he was nominated 7 times once the category was instituted. Unfortunately, he never won.
 Actors like Pran, Prem Chopra, Jeevan, Ajit, Ranjeet and Kulbhushan, who were known for their portrayal of negative roles in the '70s and '80s.

Ashutosh Rana is the only actor to have won the award twice in a row, in 1998 and 1999. Amrish Puri was nominated consecutively for 3 years from 1991 to 1993. Also, Danny Denzongpa is the only actor to have been nominated twice in the same year in 1994, although he failed to win.

Abhishek Bachchan and Priyanka Chopra are the only actors to have been nominated in another acting category along with the Best Villain category for the same role. Abhishek Bachchan was nominated for Best Supporting Actor as well for Yuva. Priyanka Chopra was nominated also for Best Supporting Actress for Aitraaz.

In 1997, Kajol became the first female actor to be nominated in this category and win the award for her role in Gupt. She and Priyanka Chopra (for Aitraaz) are the only female actors who won this award. Other actresses to have been nominated are Urmila Matondkar for Pyaar Tune Kya Kiya in 2001, Shabana Azmi for Makdee in 2002, Bipasha Basu for Jism in 2003, Preity Zinta for Armaan in 2003 and Amrita Singh for Kalyug in 2005.

Preity Zinta for Armaan in 2003 is the only actor to be nominated for Best Actress as well as this award in the same year.

Multiple nominations
The following 16 actors have received multiple Best Villain nominations. The list is sorted by the number of total awards (with the number of total nominations listed in parentheses).

Winners and nominees
In the list below, the winner of the award for each year is shown first, followed by the other nominees. The films are listed by the years when the award was presented.

1990s
 1992 Sadashiv Amrapurkar as Maharani – Sadak
 Amrish Puri as Chuniya Chand Chaukhan a.k.a. Chuniya Mama – Saudagar
 Danny Dengzongpa as Bhaktawar – Hum
 Om Puri as Suraj Narayan Singh a.k.a. Baapji – Narsimha
 Raza Murad as Daroga Shahbaz Khan – Henna
 1993 Nana Patekar as Majid Khan – Angaar
 Amrish Puri as General Dong – Tahalka
 Kiran Kumar as Pasha – Khuda Gawah
 1994 Paresh Rawal as Velji – Sir
 Amrish Puri as Barrister Indrajit Chaddha – Damini
 Gulshan Grover as Chhappan Tikli a.k.a. Jimmy – Sir
 Raj Babbar as Jagannath Tripathi – Dalaal
 Shah Rukh Khan as Rahul Mehra – Darr
 1995 Shah Rukh Khan as Vijay Agnihotri – Anjaam
 Danny Denzongpa as Chatur Singh Chitah – Krantiveer
 Danny Denzongpa as Dilawar Singh – Vijaypath
 Naseeruddin Shah as Mr.Jindal – Mohra
 1996 Mithun Chakraborty as Amavas a.k.a. Vijay Bahadur Kunwar / Police Inspector Kranti Kumar (Double Role) – Jallaad
 Amrish Puri as Durjan Singh – Karan Arjun
 Ashish Vidyarthi as Commander Bhadra – Drohkaal
 Danny Denzongpa as ACP Negi – Barsaat
 Mohan Agashe as Kooka – Trimurti
 1997 Arbaaz Khan as Vikram – Daraar
 Ashish Vidyarthi as Ramanbhai – Is Raat Ki Subah Nahin
 Danny Denzongpa as Katya – Ghatak
 Milind Gunaji as Inspector Indrajeet Saxena – Fareb
 Naseeruddin Shah as Ajay Narang – Chaahat
 1998 Kajol as Isha Diwan – Gupt
 Aditya Pancholi as Siddharth Chaudhary – Yes Boss
 Amrish Puri as Raja Sahab – Koyla
 Milind Gunaji as Bali Thakur – Virasat
 Sadashiv Amrapurkar as Ranjit Rai – Ishq
 1999 Ashutosh Rana as Gokul Pandit – Dushman
Govind Namdeo as Thakurdas Jhawle aka 'Bhau'– Satya
 Mukesh Tiwari as Jageera – China Gate
 Shah Rukh Khan as Manu Dada – Duplicate
 Sharat Saxena as Raunak "Ronnie" Singh – Ghulam

2000s
 2000 Ashutosh Rana as Lajja Shankar Pandey – Sangharsh
 Amrish Puri as Surya Singh Thapar – Baadshah
 Naseeruddin Shah as Gulfam Hassan – Sarfarosh
 Rahul Bose as Sunny – Thakshak
 Sayaji Shinde as Bacchu "Bhaiyyaji" Yadav – Shool
 2001 Sunil Shetty as Dev Ranjan Chopra – Dhadkan
 Govinda as Om Srivastav/Mahendra Pratap Singhania – Shikari
 Jackie Shroff as Hilal Kohistani – Mission Kashmir
 Rahul Dev as Naseer Ahmed – Champion
 Sharad Kapoor as Prakash Sharma – Josh
 2002 Akshay Kumar as Vikram Bajaj (Vicky) – Ajnabee
 Aftab Shivdasani as Shekhar Saxena – Kasoor
 Amrish Puri as Mayor Ashraf Ali – Gadar: Ek Prem Katha
 Manoj Bajpai as Raghavan Ghatge – Aks
 Urmila Matondkar as Ria Jaiswal – Pyaar Tune Kya Kiya
 2003 Ajay Devgn as Tarang / Ranjeet Bharadwaj – Deewangee
 Akshaye Khanna as Karan Malhotra – Humraaz
 Manoj Bajpai as Babu – Road
 Nana Patekar as Narsimha – Shakti: The Power
 Shabana Azmi as Makdee – Makdee
 2004 Irfan Khan as Ranvijay Singh – Haasil
 Bipasha Basu as Sonia Khanna – Jism
 Feroz Khan as Saba Karim Shah – Janasheen
 Preity Zinta as Sonia Sinha – Armaan
 Yashpal Sharma as Sunder Yadav – Gangaajal
 2005 Priyanka Chopra as Sonia Roy – Aitraaz
Abhishek Bachchan as Lallan Singh – Yuva
Ajay Devgn as Yashwant Angre – Khakee
 John Abraham as Kabir – Dhoom
Sunil Shetty as Raghavan Singh Dutta – Main Hoon Na
 2006 Nana Patekar as Tabrez Alam – ApaharanAjay Devgn as Kaali Pratap Singh – Kaal
 Amrita Singh as Simi Roy – Kalyug
 Kay Kay Menon as Vishnu Nagre – Sarkar
 Pankaj Kapoor as Himmat Mehndi / Jambwal – Dus
 2007 Saif Ali Khan as Ishwar "Langda" Tyagi – Omkara' Boman Irani as Lucky Singh – Lage Raho Munna Bhai Emraan Hashmi as Akash – Gangster John Abraham as Rohit Chopra – Zinda Naseeruddin Shah as Dr. Siddhant Arya – KrrishSee also
 Filmfare Awards
 Bollywood
 Cinema of India

References
Nasreen Munni Kabir's book Bollywood'', Channel 4 Books 2001, for a whole chapter on villains and vamps.

Performance in a Negative Role